Lick Run is a tributary of White Deer Creek in Union County and Lycoming County, in Pennsylvania, in the United States. The stream has one unnamed tributary. Wild trout naturally reproduce within Lick Run, and beavers began assembling a dam on it at least once.

Course

Lick Run begins on South White Deer Ridge in White Deer Township, Union County. It flows west-northwest through a deep, broad valley for several tenths of a mile, entering Washington Township, Lycoming County. Here, the stream turns west-southwest for several tenths of a mile as its valley deepens and narrows. It then turns south for more than a mile, reentering White Deer Township, Union County, receiving an unnamed tributary from the left, and passing by Little Mountain. The stream then crosses Interstate 80 and continues flowing south for a few tenths of a mile before turning southeast and reaching its confluence with White Deer Creek.

Geography and geology

Watershed
The stream is entirely within the United States Geological Survey quadrangle of Williamsport SE. Its mouth is located near White Deer.

History
Lick Run was entered into the Geographic Names Information System on August 2, 1979. Its identifier in the Geographic Names Information System is 1179299.

The White Deer Valley Railroad, which was incorporated on December 11, 1900, passed in the vicinity of Lick Run. It was built in 1901 and was owned by John Duncan as a logging railroad. However, it was sold to the White Deer Lumber Company and became the White Deer and Loganton Railroad on April 17, 1906. By the early 1900s, the remains of an old log cabin had been discovered near the headwaters of Lick Run, on the road to the "Lost Valley".

Biology
Wild trout naturally reproduce in Lick Run from its headwaters downstream to its mouth. In 1913, beavers began constructing a dam on the stream. However, one of the beavers was killed by a fisherman and the other left the area.

See also
Mile Run (White Deer Creek), next tributary of White Deer Creek going upstream
List of rivers of Pennsylvania

References

Rivers of Union County, Pennsylvania
Rivers of Lycoming County, Pennsylvania
Tributaries of White Deer Creek
Rivers of Pennsylvania